The 2018–19 Troy Trojans men's basketball team represents Troy University during the 2018–19 NCAA Division I men's basketball season. The Trojans, led by sixth-year head coach Phil Cunningham, play their home games at Trojan Arena in Troy, Alabama as members of the Sun Belt Conference.

Previous season
The Trojans finished the 2017–18 season 16–17, 9–9 in Sun Belt play to finish in a three-way tie for fifth place. They defeated South Alabama in the first round of the Sun Belt tournament before losing in the quarterfinals to Georgia State.

Roster

Schedule and results

|-
!colspan=9 style=| Non-conference regular season

|-
!colspan=9 style=| Sun Belt Conference regular season

|-

References

2018-19
2018 in sports in Alabama
2019 in sports in Alabama
2018–19 Sun Belt Conference men's basketball season